Wang Panyuan (c. 1908 – 22 December 2017, aged 109) was a Chinese-Taiwanese painter. In 2001 he received the National Arts Award of Taiwan. He painted well into his old age, with his last public appearance being in May 2015. Born in Jiangsu, he went to Taiwan in 1949 as a soldier. He died of multiple organ failure on 22 December 2017 in Yilan County, Taiwan.

See also
Taiwanese art
Chinese art

References

1900s births
2017 deaths
Taiwanese painters
Taiwanese people from Jiangsu
Taiwanese centenarians
Men centenarians
Deaths from multiple organ failure
Date of birth unknown
People from Yilan County, Taiwan